Cottage Grove Township is one of twelve townships in Allen County, Kansas, United States. As of the 2010 census, its population was 246.

Geography
According to the USGS, it contains two cemeteries: Kerns and Saint Peters.

The streams of Coal Creek, Goose Creek and Rocky Branch run through this township.

References
 USGS Geographic Names Information System (GNIS)

External links
 US-Counties.com
 City-Data.com

Townships in Allen County, Kansas
Townships in Kansas